Shahriar Bahrani is an Iranian director.

Selected filmography
 2009: The Kingdom of Solomon
 2000: Saint Mary
 1997: Inverted world
 1993: The Attack on H-3
 1989: Don't Muddy the Water!
...

References

Iranian film directors
Living people
1951 births
People from Tehran